Bagirov or Baghirov is a masculine surname, its feminine counterpart is Bagirova or Baghirova. It may refer to:

Allahverdi Bagirov (1946–1992), Azerbaijani politician
Anar Baghirov (born 1976), Azerbaijani lawyer
Faiq Bağırov
Hajibaba Baghirov (1932–2006), Azerbaijani actor
Huseyngulu Baghirov (born 1955), Azerbaijani politician 
Kamran Baghirov (1933–2000), Azerbaijani communist leader 
Mir Jafar Baghirov  (1896–1956), Azerbaijani communist leader
Museyib Baghirov (1915–1981), Azerbaijani Red Army captain
Natik Bagirov (born 1964), Azerbaijani judoka 
Parviz Baghirov (born 1994), Azerbaijani Olympic boxer
Samir Bağırov (born 1967), Azerbaijani pop singer
Vladimir Bagirov (1936–2000), Soviet chess player, author and trainer
 (born 1954), Azerbaijani and Russian expert in the field of global energy